Joanne Limmer (born 29 March 1974) is a former professional tennis player from Australia.

Biography
Limmer, a right-handed player from Melbourne, began playing tennis at the age of six and had a successful career in junior tennis. Most notably, she won the girls' singles title at the 1992 Australian Open, where she beat Lindsay Davenport in the final. This came after she had competed in the senior main draw that year and reached the second round, by beating world No. 38, Emanuela Zardo.

As a professional player, she had a best ranking of 141 in the world, which she attained in 1993. Her best win on the WTA Tour came against Rosalyn Fairbank, the ninth seed at the 1993 edition of the Brisbane Hardcourt Championships. In doubles, she twice appeared in the main draw at Wimbledon and won five titles on the ITF Circuit.

Limmer retired from the tour in 1997.

ITF Circuit finals

Singles (1–2)

Doubles (5–9)

References

External links
 
 

1974 births
Living people
Australian female tennis players
Australian Open (tennis) junior champions
Tennis players from Melbourne
Grand Slam (tennis) champions in girls' singles
20th-century Australian women